Thirteen Tales of Love and Revenge is the third studio album by American duo The Pierces, released on March 20, 2007 by Lizard King Records.

"Three Wishes" and "Secret" appeared in an episode of the television series Gossip Girl, titled "Hi, Society". The episode aired on December 5, 2007 and features a cameo appearance by The Pierces. The music videos for "Boring" and "Secret" were also included on the season 1 DVD. 

"Secret" is also the theme song for the television series Pretty Little Liars and some of its lyrics are quoted during an episode in the second season, titled "Over My Dead Body". In 2019, a cover version of "Secret" was performed by Denmark + Winter, and served as the theme for the third Pretty Little Liars series, The Perfectionists. A remix version was used as the theme for the fourth series in the franchise, Original Sin.

The Pierces themselves later released their new version of "Secret" titled "Secret 2020", on June 23, 2020.

Track listing

Charts

References

2007 albums
The Pierces albums